Michael Kaufman (born March 27, 1951) is a Canadian author, educator, and theorist focused on engaging men and boys to promote gender equality, end violence against women, and end self-destructive ideals of manhood. He co-founded the White Ribbon Campaign in 1991, the largest network of men working to ending violence against women worldwide. Michael Kaufman also co-founded the Men for Women's Choice campaign with Gordon Cleveland in 1989. He is a senior fellow of Instituto Promundo, an NGO based in Rio de Janeiro and Washington, D.C.

Background
Michael Kaufman was born in Cleveland, Ohio. He received a B.A. in Arts and Sciences from the University of Toronto, an M.A. in Political Economy from the University of Toronto, and a Ph.D.  in Political Science from the University of Toronto. From 1979 until 1992, he taught primarily at York University in Toronto.

Work
Michael Kaufman has worked as a lecturer and advisor to international NGOs, governments, universities and colleges, trade unions, and corporations. He has worked with many non-governmental organizations including Amnesty International, OXFAM, and Save the Children. He has worked extensively with the United Nations, including with UNESCO, UNICEF, UN Women, UNDP, UNFPA, and IFAD. He has written or edited eight books, as well as numerous reports and articles. His work has been widely translated and has appeared in The Guardian, The Daily Telegraph, The Toronto Star and other publications.

Key Contributions
Michael Kaufman's work as co-founder and long-time volunteer with the White Ribbon Campaign in 1991, was based on the belief that a) the campaign should be decentralized, conceived of and led by the men and women within each community, b) that it should be politically non-partisan, reaching out to men across the political, religious, and social spectrum, and c) that it focus on a positive engagement of men and boys as individuals capable of bringing about change.

As a volunteer, he has been a leader in various national and international networks of profeminist men, including, most recently, MenCare, a global campaign focused on fatherhood which has the aim of men doing fifty percent of the care work on the planet.

Key Ideas
Michael Kaufman's widely published 1987 article, “The Construction of Masculinity and the Triad of Men’s Violence” postulated that our dominant forms of masculinity were constructed through ongoing, socially-sanctioned, and mutually reinforcing forms of violence: against women, against other men, and internalized against oneself.

“Men, Feminism, and Men’s Contradictory Experiences of Power” (1994 and revised in 1999) built on the argument of his book, Cracking the Armour: Power, Pain and the Lives of Men to look at the contradictory nature of men's power.

His article, “The 7 P’s of Men’s Violence” (1999) has been translated into more than a dozen languages. It draws on key points of a feminist analysis of men's violence.

“The AIM Framework: Addressing and Involving Men and Boys to Promote Gender Equality and End Gender Discrimination and Violence” (2001) synthesizes lessons from two decades of work by many individuals and organizations with men and boys and suggests that efforts to engage men must not only address men and boys about the importance of gender equality.

Selected publications
Books
 
 
 
 
 
 
 
 

Book chapters

References

External links 
http://www.michaelkaufman.com
http://feministing.com/2012/01/08/the-feministing-five-michael-kaufman/
http://www.promundo.org.br/en/news/interview-with-michael-kaufman/

1951 births
Living people
American feminist writers
Canadian feminist writers
American people of Canadian descent
20th-century American non-fiction writers
20th-century Canadian non-fiction writers
21st-century American non-fiction writers
21st-century Canadian non-fiction writers